Brave Mountain is a steep mountain, located less than  southwest of Bishop's Mitre in northern Labrador, Canada.

References

Labrador
One-thousanders of Newfoundland and Labrador